The 1985 Scottish Cup Final was played on 18 May 1985 at Hampden Park in Glasgow and was the final of the 100th season of the Scottish Cup. The previous winners were Aberdeen, who had beaten Celtic in the 1984 final, but they were knocked out by Dundee United at the Semi-final stage. The Final was contested by Celtic and Dundee United. Celtic won the match 2–1, thanks to a free kick scored by Davie Provan and a late diving header from Frank McGarvey.

Match
The first half was a tame affair, with neither Pat Bonner or Hamish McAlpine been required to make a save of note.  Dundee United opened the scoring on 53 minutes; Eamonn Bannon passed to David Dodds who controlled the ball whilst holding off a challenge, then slipped the ball to Stuart Beedie who fired a low shot past Bonner's left hand into the corner of the goal.  Trailing to Dundee United, Celtic manager Davie Hay make a tactical change in the second half by pushing Roy Aitken forward from central defence into midfield.  The move proved a success as Aitken's presence in midfield began to galvanise Celtic.  A virtuoso free-kick from Davie Provan in 77 minutes equalised the earlier goal from Dundee Utd's Beedie, only the third occasion that a goal had been scored direct from a free-kick in a Scottish Cup Final.  Five minutes from the end, a driving run and cross from down the right by Aitken set up a diving header from Frank McGarvey to win the game for Celtic.

Roy Aitken, who had been sent off in the previous year's final, won the Man of the Match Award.

Celtic and Dundee United would again meet in the final three years later, when Celtic would once again come from a goal down to beat United by two goals to one.

Details

Man of the Match:
 Roy Aitken (Celtic)

Match officials
Referee:
 Brian McGinlay
Linesmen:
 ??
 ??

Match rules
 90 minutes.
 30 minutes of extra time if necessary.
 Match replayed if scores still level.

References

1985
Cup Final
Scottish Cup Final 1985
Scottish Cup Final 1985
20th century in Glasgow
May 1985 sports events in the United Kingdom